The Montreal Metro consists of 68 stations on four lines and is operated by the Société de transport de Montréal in Montreal, Quebec, Canada.

Odonyms and namesakes

Lines

Interstation distances

References 
 Montreal by Metro: source for dates and distances.

Société de transport de Montréal
Lists of metro stations
 
Metro
Lists of railway stations in Canada
Lists of buildings and structures in Quebec